Cameron Watson (born 31 May 1987) is a Scottish Australian football (soccer) player who plays as a defensive midfielder for National Premier Leagues Victoria 2 side Moreland Zebras FC.

Club career

FC Porto and VVV-Venlo
Watson previously played in the youth and reserve teams of Portuguese Liga club FC Porto for one season before joining Dutch club VVV-Venlo, where he made a handful of appearances. From there he  trained with both Melbourne Victory and Sydney FC in an intention to sign with either club before signing on with Melbourne Knights. Watson was linked to a move to Gold Coast United after head coach, Miron Bleiberg, expressed his interest in signing him. Did not sign for Gold Coast United due to an injury. On 28 April 2010 he scored for Melbourne Heart in a team of trialists against the Whittlesea Zebras.

Adelaide United
Watson signed for Adelaide United in the A-League on an injury replacement loan for Fabian Barbiero. He played his first match in round 1 of the 2010–2011 A-League season coming on as a substitute.

Watson signed a permanent 2-year undisclosed contract with Adelaide United in January 2011, taking him to the end of the 2012–2013 A-League season.

At the conclusion of the 2014–2015 A-League season, Watson's contract was not renewed.

Newcastle Jets
On 24 July 2015, Watson signed a 1-year deal with the Newcastle Jets. He was released by the Newcastle Jets at the conclusion of his contract in April 2016.

Bengaluru FC
On 5 August 2016, Watson joined I-League champions Bengaluru FC.

Mohun Bagan A.C
On 18 December 2017, Watson joined Mohun Bagan. He replaced his fellow countryman Diogo Ferreira who was released by the club recently.

Personal life
Cameron Watson's father, George Watson, previously played with Stirling Albion in the Scottish First Division before emigrating to Australia in the early 1980s.

References

External links
 Adelaide United profile 

1987 births
Living people
Association football midfielders
Soccer players from Melbourne
Australian people of Scottish descent
Australian expatriate soccer players
FC Porto B players
Melbourne Knights FC players
VVV-Venlo players
Adelaide United FC players
Newcastle Jets FC players
Bengaluru FC players
A-League Men players
Australian Institute of Sport soccer players
Victorian Institute of Sport alumni
Expatriate footballers in India
Australia youth international soccer players
Australian soccer players
Australian expatriate sportspeople in India
Australian expatriate sportspeople in Indonesia
Australian expatriate sportspeople in Portugal
Expatriate footballers in Portugal
Expatriate footballers in Indonesia
Expatriate footballers in the Netherlands
Australian expatriate sportspeople in the Netherlands